Benny Gall (born 14 March 1971) is a Danish former footballer who played as a goalkeeper, and the current head coach of fourth tier Denmark Series club BK Avarta.

He has previously been the manager of B93's 2nd Division East team and Elite 3000 Helsingør, BK Avarta. Before his job at B.93, he was the manager of F.C. Copenhagen's reserve team, Kjøbenhavns Boldklub. He also worked as an assistant coach at Akademisk Boldklub (AB).

Gall, had a sporadically successful playing career in Denmark and a spell, with Shrewsbury Town in England when they were in Division Three.
Galls first club was BK Fremad Amager near his home town of Copenhagen.
Spells at Brønshøj BK Dordrecht 90 and De Graafschap followed, before he moved across to England to join up with Jake Kings Shrewsbury Town.
While not an overly successful period in the club's history, Gall managed almost 40 appearances as he battled for the 1st team jersey with Paul Edwards.
By 2001, Gall had returned to his native Denmark finishing his career with F.C. Copenhagen
in a player coach capacity.

Honours
Danish Superliga: 2002-03, 2003-04, 2005-06 & 2006-07 (with Copenhagen)

References

External links
Danish national team profile

1971 births
Living people
Danish men's footballers
Denmark under-21 international footballers
Association football goalkeepers
Danish Superliga players
Kjøbenhavns Boldklub players
Brønshøj Boldklub players
FC Dordrecht players
De Graafschap players
Shrewsbury Town F.C. players
Esbjerg fB players
F.C. Copenhagen players
Danish football managers
Boldklubben af 1893 managers
BK Avarta managers
FC Helsingør managers
Footballers from Copenhagen